List table of the properties and districts — listed on the California Historical Landmarks in Los Angeles County, Southern California. 

Note: Click the "Map of all coordinates" link to the right to view a Google map of all properties and districts with latitude and longitude coordinates in the table below.

|}

See also
List of California Historical Landmarks
National Register of Historic Places listings in Pasadena, California
National Register of Historic Places listings in Los Angeles County, California
National Register of Historic Places listings in Los Angeles, California

References

  

Landmarks
.
List of California Historical Landmarks
L01 
Historical
History of Southern California
Los Angeles-related lists